Dubai Towers Dubai was a proposed four tower complex in the city of Dubai, United Arab Emirates. It is now cancelled. The developer, Sama Dubai, intended this to form the centrepiece of The Lagoons, a megaproject located on Dubai Creek which was to consist of seven islands. Sama Dubai was the Project Management company in charge of the project. Due to downturn in Dubai, the project was cancelled. As the Complex were not built, The Tower was proposed.

Design
Designed by tvsdesign, these towers were intended to create a dramatic new landmark for Dubai. Their design represents the movement of candlelight and according to Thompson, Ventulett, Stainback & Associates, this is supposed to symbolise hope, harmony, growth and opportunity.

Construction status
The Dubai Towers Dubai, like the rest of The Lagoons, was never built. The developer, Sama Dubai, was forcibly merged into Emaar Properties in 2009 following extensive legal troubles. The masterplan of the area has since changed to accommodate the proposal to build Dubai Creek Tower and the surrounding Dubai Creek Harbour development.

See also
 Dubai Towers Doha
 Dubai Towers Istanbul

References

External links
 tvsdesign website

Unbuilt buildings and structures in Dubai
Proposed skyscrapers in Dubai
High-tech architecture
Neo-futurism architecture
Postmodern architecture in Dubai